6 Days to Nowhere is Italian power metal band Labyrinth's sixth album, released February 26, 2007 on Scarlet Records.

Track listing
"Crossroads" – 4:03
"There Is a Way" – 3:36
"Lost" – 4:24
"Mother Earth" – 6:08
"Waiting Tomorrow" – 3:35
"Come Together" – 4:00 (The Beatles cover)
"Just One Day" – 3:54
"What???" – 4:15
"Coldness" – 3:49
"Rusty Nail" – 3:19
"Out of Control" – 3:46
"Wolves'n'Lambs" – 4:52
"Smoke and Dreams" – 4:37
"Piece of Time" – 2:50 (2007 re-recorded version)

Personnel
 Roberto Tiranti - Vocals, Bass
 Andrea Cantarelli - Guitars
 Pier Gonella - Guitars
 Andrea De Paoli - Keyboards
 Mattia Stancioiu - Drums

References

2007 albums
Labyrinth (band) albums
Scarlet Records albums